Aleksey Aleksandrovich Obmochaev (born 22 May 1989) is a Russian volleyball player, a member of Russia men's national volleyball team and Russian club Kuzbass Kemerovo.  He was a champion at the 2012 Olympics, and a gold medalist at the 2011 World Cup.

Personal life
In 2012–2016 he was married to Russian volleyball player Natalia Goncharova.

Career
In 2012 he made his Olympic debut and became Olympic Champion with Russian national team. In 2013 he violated the Russian league regulations and was suspended for two years from the Superliga.

References

External links

 
 
 

1989 births
Living people
People from Kislovodsk
Russian men's volleyball players
Volleyball players at the 2012 Summer Olympics
Olympic volleyball players of Russia
Olympic gold medalists for Russia
Olympic medalists in volleyball
Medalists at the 2012 Summer Olympics
Universiade medalists in volleyball
Universiade gold medalists for Russia
Sportspeople from Stavropol Krai
20th-century Russian people
21st-century Russian people